André Filipe Franco Martins (born 12 October 1989) is a Portuguese professional footballer who plays as a goalkeeper.

Club career
Born in Odivelas, Lisbon District, Martins played youth football for three local clubs, including Sporting CP from ages 12 to 18. He competed solely in the lower leagues in his country, starting out at Casa Pia A.C. in the 2008–09 season.

In June 2013, Martins signed for S. League side Tampines Rovers FC from Real SC, being joined in the adventure by his compatriots Diogo Caramelo and Vítor Ladeiras. He soon picked up an injury and, at the end of the campaign, which ended with championship conquest, returned to Portugal and its third division.

References

External links

1989 births
Living people
People from Odivelas
Portuguese footballers
Association football goalkeepers
Segunda Divisão players
Casa Pia A.C. players
Real S.C. players
S.U. Sintrense players
AD Oeiras players
Atlético Clube de Portugal players
Singapore Premier League players
Tampines Rovers FC players
Portugal youth international footballers
Portuguese expatriate footballers
Expatriate footballers in Singapore
Portuguese expatriate sportspeople in Singapore
Sportspeople from Lisbon District